Allium cupani Raf. is a species of wild onion from the central and eastern Mediterranean region.

References

External links
 

cupani
Flora of Europe